Alberta Provincial Highway No. 52, commonly referred to as Highway 52, is an east–west highway in southern Alberta, Canada, south of Lethbridge that connects Highway 4 to Highway 5 via Raymond.

Major intersections 
From west to east:

References 

052
County of Warner No. 5